Sodero is a surname. Notable people with the surname include:

 Cesare Sodero (1886–1947), Italian conductor 
 Javier Sodero (born 1964), Argentine footballer 

Italian-language surnames